Shirley Deane (born Shirley Deane Blattenberger; March 16, 1913 – April 26, 1983) was an American film actress.

Born to Jesse H. Blattenberger and his wife Zola (née Redden), she was raised by her maternal grandmother.

She was best known as an actress for playing "Bonnie Jones" in 20th Century Fox's Jones Family series of films.

Filmography

References

Bibliography
 Tucker, David C. The Women Who Made Television Funny: Ten Stars of 1950s Sitcoms. McFarland, 2015.

External links

1913 births
1983 deaths
American film actresses
20th-century American actresses
Actresses from Fresno, California